Johann Christian Schieferdecker (or Schiefferdecker; 16791732) was a German Baroque composer.

Schieferdecker was born in Teuchern.  He became harpsichord-player at the Hamburg Opera, then succeeded Dietrich Buxtehude as organist of the Marienkirche in Lübeck.  He died in Lübeck.

Works, editions and recordings
XII musicalische Concerte, Hamburg 1713
Recordings
Geistliche Konzerte: Triumph, Triumph, Belial ist nun erleget; Auf, auf, mein Herz, Sinn und Gemüte; In te Domine speravi; Weicht, ihr schwarzen Trauerwolken. Klaus Mertens, Hamburger Ratsmusik, Simone Eckert. Carus-Verlag, 2012, ASIN B007WA0VTQ
Musicalische Concerte (Hamburg 1713). Elbipolis Barockorchester Hamburg, Challenge Records CC72531, 2011, UPC/EAN 608917253122, ASIN B0062EOZ3Q

References

1679 births
1732 deaths
People from Teuchern
German Baroque composers
18th-century classical composers
German male classical composers
18th-century German composers
18th-century German male musicians